Bräunlingen is a town in the district of Schwarzwald-Baar, in Baden-Württemberg, Germany. It is situated on the river Breg, 4 km southwest of Donaueschingen.

Sons and daughters of the city 
 Johann Baptist Weber (1756-1826), master builder of the early Classicism in southwest Germany
 Hermann Ohlicher (born 1949), former soccer player (VfB Stuttgart).

References

Schwarzwald-Baar-Kreis